Sloane Stephens was the defending champion, but could not participate this year as she was recovering from a left foot surgery.

Lesia Tsurenko won the title, defeating Kristina Mladenovic in the final, 6–1, 7–5.

Seeds

Draw

Finals

Top half

Bottom half

Qualifying

Seeds

Qualifiers

Draw

First qualifier

Second qualifier

Third qualifier

Fourth qualifier

Fifth qualifier

Sixth qualifier

External links
 WTA tournament draws

2017 Abierto Mexicano Telcel